The following is a list of countries by coffee exports. Data is for 2012 & 2016, in millions of United States dollars, as reported by The Observatory of Economic Complexity. Currently the top twenty countries (as of 2016) are listed.

References

atlas.media.mit.edu - Observatory of Economic complexity - Countries that export Coffee (2012)
atlas.media.mit.edu - Observatory of Economic complexity - Countries that export Coffee (2016)

Coffee
Coffee industry